Yoel Sela (יואל סלע; born June 10, 1951) is an Israeli Olympic competitive sailor. He was born in Hadera, Israel, and is Jewish.

Sailing career
When Sela competed in the Olympics he was 5–7 (171 cm) tall, and weighed 168 lbs (76 kg).

Sela competed for Israel at the 1976 Summer Olympics with Yehuda Maayan, at the age of 25, in Montréal, Canada, in Sailing – Mixed Two Person Heavyweight Dinghy, and came in 17th. He competed for Israel at the 1984 Summer Olympics with Eldad Amir, at the age of 33, in Los Angeles, California, in Sailing – Mixed Two Person Heavyweight Dinghy, and came in 8th.

Sela competed for Israel at the 1988 Summer Olympics with Eldad Amir, at the age of 37, in Seoul, Korea, in Sailing – Mixed Two Person Heavyweight Dinghy, and came in 4th.  They came very close to winning the first Olympic medal in Israeli history, missing one by 11.30 points. Their second race fell on Yom Kippur, and Israeli officials forbade them from competing that day, so they had missed that race.  Had they been able to compete in the second race, they would have certainly medaled.

In 1990, Sela and Amir came in 5th in the World Championships.  In 1991, they won the Italian Open and came in second in the France Open.

Sela competed for Israel at the 1992 Summer Olympics with Eldad Amir, at the age of 41, in Barcelona, Spain, in Sailing – Mixed Two Person Heavyweight Dinghy, and came in 20th.

References

External links
 

Living people
Jewish sailors (sport)
Olympic sailors of Israel
People from Hadera
1951 births
Israeli Jews
Israeli male sailors (sport)
Sailors at the 1976 Summer Olympics – Flying Dutchman
Sailors at the 1984 Summer Olympics – Flying Dutchman
Sailors at the 1988 Summer Olympics – Flying Dutchman
Sailors at the 1992 Summer Olympics – Flying Dutchman